Imola railway station (Italian: stazione di Imola) is a railway station serving Imola, in the region of Emilia–Romagna, in northern Italy. It lies on the Bologna–Ancona railway.

Services

The station is the eastern terminus of Line S4B on the Bologna metropolitan railway service.

Passenger and train movements 
In 2007, the daily ridership amounted to 2,233 passengers. In 2018, the average number of passengers departing from the station daily has been estimated at 2,894 passengers per day.

Bibliography 
 Rete Ferroviaria Italiana, Fascicolo Linea 84.

References

Railway stations in Emilia-Romagna